The list of ship launches in 1686 includes a chronological list of some ships launched in 1686.


References

1686
Ship launches